Kreider is a surname. Notable people with the surname include:

Alan Kreider (1941-2017), American Mennonite church historian
Alec Devon Kreider (1991–2017), American murderer
Chris Kreider (born 1991), American ice hockey player
Dan Kreider (born 1977), American football player
Jim Kreider (born 1955), American politician
Kalee Kreider (born 1971), American environmental communicator
Steve Kreider (born 1958), American football player

See also
Kreider Shoe Manufacturing Company